Oichalia is a village and a municipality in Messenia, Greece. The seat of the municipality is in Meligalas. Oichalia is known for its rich expanse of olive trees and fig orchards. At its height the village boasted several cafes, a bustling farmer's market, and a popular open-air cinema run by the Limberopoulos family.  Other families, such as the Hantzopoulos and Karbaliotis clans, the former a cobbler and the latter a butcher, helped make Oichalia the destination of choice for Messinians in need of footwear and quality meats.

Municipality 
The municipality Oichalia was formed at the 2011 local government reform by the merger of the following 5 former municipalities, that became municipal units:
Andania 
Dorio 
Eira 
Meligalas 
Oichalia 

The municipality has an area of 415.433 km2, the municipal unit 59.060 km2.

References

Municipalities of Peloponnese (region)
Populated places in Messenia